Arkansas Highway 374 (AR 374) is the designation for multiple state highways in Arkansas.

Section 1
Section 1 of AR 374 is a state highway of  that runs in Newton County. It serves as a connector from  AR 7 to AR 74/AR 123 near Vendor. It does not cross or run concurrent with any other state highways.

Sections 3 and 4
Sections 3 and 4 of AR 374 are two state highways totaling  in length that run in Searcy County. Typically, concurrencies are not signed along Arkansas State Highways though signage at both US 65 intersections show AR 374 continuing along the  segment of US 65 connecting the two sections.

Junction list

References

External links

374
Transportation in Newton County, Arkansas
Transportation in Searcy County, Arkansas